Odelay is the fifth studio album by American musician Beck, released on June 18, 1996, by DGC Records. The album featured several successful singles, including "Where It's At", "Devils Haircut", and "The New Pollution", and peaked at number sixteen on the Billboard 200. As of July 2008, the album had sold 2.3 million copies in the United States, making Odelay Beck's most successful album to date. Since its release, the album has appeared in numerous publications' lists of the greatest of the 1990s and of all time.

Recording
The sessions for what would become Odelay originally began as a subdued, acoustic affair. In 1994, Beck started to record tracks for his follow-up to Mellow Gold with Bong Load producers Tom Rothrock and Rob Schnapf. Only the tracks "Ramshackle", "Feather in Your Cap", and "Brother" from these sessions have been released, all of which are acoustic, sparse, and melancholic. He would eventually abandon work with Rothrock and Schnapf, opting to work with the Dust Brothers instead. The Dust Brothers' production style was hip-hop-focused yet more layered; their résumé included notable work with Beastie Boys, Tone Lōc and Young MC.

Title and artwork
The title is a phonetic English rendering of the Mexican slang interjection "órale", which translates roughly to "listen up" or "what's up?" The phrase "odelay" is repeated in the lyrics during the outro of the song "Lord Only Knows". According to Stephen Malkmus, the title is a pun on Oh Delay, since the album took very long to record. The album's cover is a photo of a Komondor, a rare Hungarian breed of dog with a heavy, corded coat, jumping over a hurdle. The original photo was shot by canine photographer Joan Ludwig (1914–2004) for the July 1977 issue of the American Kennel Club’s Gazette.

"Odelay" Tour 
The promotional tour for the album began in May-June 1996, appearing in several record stores and Radio Stations in the U.S. Throughout the rest of the year followed numerous U.S. tours and European festival dates. 

However it was as the tour continued into 1997 that Beck began playing larger venues in America. The tour unofficially ended on September 5th, 1997, with a taped band performance at "Sessions at West 54th" in New York, after over 150 shows from July '96 until September '97. 

It was on the "Odelay" tour that earned Beck a wide reputation as an energetic and impeccable performer, and his profile rose after multiple appearances on MTV, the Howard Stern Radio Show, the 1997 Grammys, Later with Jools Holland and more.

Critical reception

Upon release, Odelay received almost unanimous critical acclaim. Odelay was nominated for the Grammy Award for Album of the Year and won a Grammy Award for Best Alternative Music Album in 1997, as well as a Grammy Award for Best Male Rock Vocal Performance for "Where It's At". It was ranked 16 in [[Spin (magazine)|Spins]] "100 Greatest Albums, 1985–2005". Odelay was awarded Album of the Year by the American magazine Rolling Stone. It was voted as the best album of the year in The Village Voice Pazz & Jop critics poll, and also in NMEs annual critics poll. In 1998, Q magazine readers voted Odelay the 51st greatest album of all time. The album was ranked number 306 on Rolling Stone magazine's list of the 500 greatest albums of all time in 2013, and later ranked number 424 in the 2020 edition, and number 9 on its list of the 100 best albums of the nineties. Voters in Channel 4's 2005 "100 Greatest Albums" poll placed it at number 73. The music website Pitchfork ranked it at #19 on their top 100 albums of the 1990s.  The album was also included in the book 1001 Albums You Must Hear Before You Die.
In 2000 it was voted number 54 in Colin Larkin's All Time Top 1000 Albums.

Rob Sheffield in an AllMusic review feels that, like Mellow Gold, Odelay incorporates elements from various genres, including "folk and country, grungy garage rock, stiff-boned electro, louche exotica, old-school rap and noise rock." Additional influences include punk rock, bossa nova, Latin soul and mainstream R&B.

Track listing

Original issue
All songs written by Beck, John King and Michael Simpson, except where noted.
Produced by Beck Hansen and The Dust Brothers, except where noted.

Deluxe edition
On January 29, 2008, Odelay – Deluxe Edition was released. The two-disc set contains the original album, plus 19 B-sides, remixes and previously unreleased songs. The liner notes feature complete lyrics and artwork as well as an essay from Thurston Moore and the transcript of 15 high school students interviewed by Dave Eggers. The cover art was deliberately edited to appear as if it was a personalized copy of the album, with stickers carelessly half-ripped off and various doodles on it (such as a face drawn on the dog and rainbows behind it) and including the phrase "Property of Michael" written on the back. The exclusion of "Diskobox" may have been done as a deliberate nod to the cover art having the 'strictly limited edition bonus track' sticker partly torn off.

"Diskobox", which appeared on the original UK and Japanese pressings of Odelay, was not included on the deluxe edition for unknown reasons. The Odelay sessions version of "Debra" (later re-recorded for Midnite Vultures) is also absent, despite initial statements to the contrary.

Some of the bonus tracks on the Deluxe Edition (specifically "Deadweight" and "Clock") appear to be from lossy (e.g. MP3) sources. Some of the tracks included have been altered beyond simple remastering. No official explanation for these changes has been given. Some of these alterations are listed below:

First CD:
 "Hotwax" has a more double tracked vocal during the verses
 "The New Pollution" has the same synthesized beeps from the original version, but played at a different pitch
 "Sissyneck" has a slightly extended 'breakdown' part at around 2:00
Bonus CD:
 "Thunderpeel" is folded down to mono from the regular stereo version
 "Electric Music And The Summer People" is an alternate mix
 "Erase the Sun" runs at a faster speed (the original release may be slowed down)
 "Trouble All My Days" is folded down to mono from the regular stereo versionDisc 1 "Devils Haircut" – 3:15
 "Hotwax" – 3:49
 "Lord Only Knows" – 4:15
 "The New Pollution" – 3:39
 "Derelict" – 4:13
 "Novacane" – 4:37
 "Jack-Ass" – 4:12
 "Where It's At" – 5:30
 "Minus" – 2:32
 "Sissyneck" – 3:57
 "Readymade" – 2:37
 "High 5 (Rock the Catskills)" – 4:11
 "Ramshackle" – 4:47
 "Hidden Track (Computer Rock)" – 0:43
 "Deadweight" – 6:12
 "Inferno" (previously unreleased) – 7:03
 "Gold Chains" (previously unreleased) – 4:59Disc 2'''
 "Where It's At" (U.N.K.L.E. remix) – 12:26
 "Richard's Hairpiece" (remix by Aphex Twin) – 3:19
 "American Wasteland" (remix by Mickey P.) – 2:42
 "Clock" – 3:17
 "Thunder Peel" – 2:40
 Different version than the one on Stereopathetic Soulmanure''.
 "Electric Music and the Summer People" – 4:38
 "Lemonade" – 2:21
 "SA-5" – 1:53
 "Feather in Your Cap" – 3:46
 "Erase the Sun" – 2:56
Sped up from the originally released length of 3:16.
 "000.000" – 5:25
 "Brother" – 4:47
 "Devil Got My Woman" – 4:34
 "Trouble All My Days" – 2:25
 "Strange Invitation" – 4:06
 "Burro" – 3:13

Personnel

Musicians
Beck Hansen – vocals (all tracks), electric guitar (tracks 1–4, 6–12), slide guitar (track 2, 3), acoustic guitar (tracks 3, 7, 13), bass guitar (tracks 1–4, 6–12), organ (tracks 1, 4–6, 8, 10), clavinet (tracks 2, 4), electric piano (tracks 6–8), moog synthesizer (tracks 2, 5, 6, 9, 12), harmonica (tracks 1, 2, 6, 7), drums (track 5), percussion (tracks 5, 10), thumb piano (track 5), rhumba box (track 5), xylophone (track 7), turntables (track 9), echoplex (track 12)
Dust Brothers – turntables (tracks 1, 2, 6, 8, 12), drum machine (tracks 6, 12)
Joey Waronker – drums (tracks 3, 6, 9, 13), percussion (tracks 3, 9, 12, 13), chimes (track 9)
Mike Millius – scream (track 3)
Mike Boito – organ (tracks 8, 10, 12), clavinet (track 6), trumpet (track 8)
David Brown – saxophone (track 8)
Money Mark – organ (track 8)
Greg Leisz – pedal steel guitar (track 10)
Charlie Haden – upright bass (track 13)
Ross Harris – "(The Enchanting Wizard of Rhythm)" (track 2)

Production
Beck Hansen, Dust Brothers – production, mixing (exc. 9, 13, 14)
Beck Hansen, Brian Paulson, Mario Caldato, Jr. – production, mixing (9)
Tom Rothrock, Rob Schnapf – production, mixing (13)
Beck Hansen, Jon Spencer, Dust Brothers – production, mixing (14)
Bob Ludwig – mastering
Shauna O'Brien – coordination, production coordination
Mark Kates – A&R
John Silva – management

Artwork
Beck Hansen, Robert Fisher – art direction, design
Al Hansen, Manuel Ocampo, Zarim Osborn – collage images
Manuel Ocampo – inlay painting
Joan Ludwig – cover photography
Nitin Vadukul – photography of Beck

Charts

Weekly charts

Year-end charts

Certifications

References

External links
 

Beck albums
1996 albums
Albums produced by Brian Paulson
Albums produced by the Dust Brothers
Geffen Records albums
Albums produced by Beck
Grammy Award for Best Alternative Music Album
Albums produced by Mario Caldato Jr.